Cathy Brown may refer to:

 Cathy Gordon Brown (born 1965), independent candidate for President of the United States in the United States presidential election, 2000
 Cathy Brown (boxer) (born 1970), British boxer

See also
 Kathy Brown (born 1970), American singer
 Catherine Brown (disambiguation)